Robert Warren Crown (January 23, 1922 – May 21, 1973) served in the California legislature and, during World War II, he served in the United States Army in an infantry combat platoon leader in France. He won nine elections in a row, and also served as a delegate at the 1960 Democratic National Convention. He was a progressive Democrat, noted for his opposition to the death penalty.

In 1973, he was struck and killed by a car while on his regular early morning jog.

Crown Memorial State Beach on the island of Alameda is named after him in recognition of his work to preserve the area.

References

United States Army personnel of World War II
Members of the California State Legislature
1922 births
1973 deaths

20th-century American politicians
Pedestrian road incident deaths
Road incident deaths in California
American expatriates in France